The women's race of the 2011 Sparkassen Giro Bochum took place on 31 July 2011. It was the 11th women's edition of the Sparkassen Giro Bochum. The race started and ended in Bochum, Germany and spanned . The race is a UCI 1.1 category race.

Ellen van Dijk, who won the race at the 2010 Sparkassen Giro Bochum, did not participate in this edition.

Results

References

2011 in German sport
Sparkassen Giro
2011 in women's road cycling